Josh: Independence Through Unity  is a 2013 Pakistani mystery thriller drama film written, directed and produced by Iram Parveen Bilal with co-producers Saad Bin Mujeeb and Kelly Thomas. Film was released at Eid-ul-Fitr in Pakistan and India on 10 August 2013. The film stars Aamina Sheikh, Mohib Mirza, Khalid Malik, Naveen Waqar, Adnan Shah, Kaiser Khan Nizamani, Parveen Akbar, Naila Jaffri, Salim Mairaj, Faizan Haqquee, Ali Rizvi in the ensemble cast.

Plot 
Josh is about Fatima (Aamina Sheikh), a dedicated school teacher, who is living a high cosmopolitan life in Karachi until one day her life shatters when her nanny Nusrat-bhi inexplicably disappears. Fatima then takes on the challenge to seek the dangerous truth in Nusrat's feudal village. The themes being tackled are class separation, feudalism, poverty, individual empowerment, and women's rights.

Cast 
 Aamina Sheikh as Fatima
 Khalid Malik as Adil
 Mohib Mirza as Uzair
 Naveen Waqar as Ayla
 Faizan Haqquee as Zeeshan
 Khalid Ahmed as Khawaja
 Adnan Shah as Gulsher
 Saleem Mairaj as Master Khalid
 Parveen Akbar as Parveen
 Naila Jaffri as Nusrat Bi
 Ali Rizvi as Ahmed
 Kaiser Khan Nizamani as Khan
 Abdullah Khan as Shera
 Saifullah Sohail as Shakeel
 Haider Salim as Shan

Release
Josh world premiered at the Mumbai International Film Festival in October 2012. The film released in Pakistan on 12 August 2013.

Soundtrack

Josh is the soundtrack album of the 2012 Urdu-language Pakistani film Josh by Iram Parveen Bilal.

Overview and reception
All songs are mixed and mastered by Shahi Hasan. The singers include Zoe Viccaji, Devika Chawla, Shahi Hasan, Noor Lodhi, Manesh Judge and Ali Azmat.

Awards 
Josh received the 2012 Women in Film Finishing Grant, the 2013 Silent River Film Festival Best First Feature and Best Actress, the 2013 Filmfest Hamburg, Best Political Film Nomination. It also won the Best Screenplay Jury Prize and the Best Feature Film Audience Prize at the Washington, D.C. South Asian Film Festival 2014.

Awards

References

External links
 
 
 

2010s Urdu-language films
Films set in Lahore
2010s feminist films
Pakistani thriller drama films
Pakistani independent films
2012 thriller drama films
2012 films
2012 drama films
Pakistani mystery films